The 2000 Philadelphia Wings season marked the team's fourteenth season of operation.

Regular season

Conference standings

Game log
Reference:

Playoffs

Game log
Reference:

Roster

See also
 Philadelphia Wings
 2000 NLL season

References

Philadelphia Wings seasons
Philadelphia Wings
2000 in lacrosse